KWVV-FM (103.5 FM, "K-Wave") is a commercial alternative rock music radio station in Homer, Alaska. KWVV-FM produces its programming in-house.

Translators
K236CC in Seward-Woodrow, Alaska, broadcasting on 95.1 FM.
K292ED in Kachemak City, Alaska, broadcasting on 106.3 FM.
K281BA in Delta Junction-Fort Greely, Alaska, broadcasting on 104.1 FM.
K285DU in Homer, Alaska, broadcasting on 104.9 FM.
K285EF in Kenai, Alaska, broadcasting on 104.9 FM.
K285AA in Kodiak, Alaska, broadcasting on 104.9 FM.
K283AB in Soldotna, Alaska, broadcasting on 104.5 FM.

External links
 K-Wave 103.5 Facebook
 

WVV-FM
Alternative rock radio stations in the United States
Radio stations established in 1966
1966 establishments in Alaska